Thames Handball Club is an amateur handball club founded in 2005 in London, UK. It is affiliated to the England Handball Association and currently runs competitive men’s handball team in Development leagues. The women's team voluntarily withdrew from official competition in 2016/17 and plays in a newly formed Handball Union.

History 

The club started with Junior teams, before getting involved in Senior competitions in 2007, first starting with a women's team, then in 2008 adding a Men's team. Both teams competed in the England Handball League. The women's team in Division 1 and the Men's team in Division II.

The club has enjoyed particular success in mixed team events and competitions, such as the Brentwood Mixed Team competition and the Oxford Open Mixed team competition. Both of which were won in 2011, 2012 and 2013. Of the Men's team, Chris Higgins made the selection into the Ireland men's national handball team in 2012. Of the women's team, Ulrike Stange now Ulrike Mertesacker, after her wedding to Arsenal ace Per Mertesacker played for the German National squad up until 2010.

Recent performance 

1st place in London Handball Association Cup 2011.
1st place in Brentwood Mixed Team Tournament 2011.
1st place in Brentwood Mixed Team Tournament 2012.
1st place in Brentwood Mixed Team Tournament 2013.
2nd place in British Beach Handball Championship 2013.
2nd place in Super 7 National League 2014
2nd place in 1st Division RDL 2015.
2nd place in Championship South  2015.
3rd place in Beach Handball Cup London 2015.
1st place RDL London 2016/17 men's league. 
1st place Beach Handball London 2016.
1st place u15 league South England.

International honours 

3rd round European Challenge Cup 2014/15

Men's team 

The men's team won the Regional Division II in 2011 and more recently achieved first place in the SportHouse London Handball League 2012/13. In season 2014/15 the men's team came second in both the national Championship South and the London Development League.

Women's team 

Playing in the National League, the women achieved a Third place in 2011/12 after a decisive final day of the EHA League by beating London GD Handball Club by 2 goals and in 2012/13 was runner up in the EHA National Cup competition in 2013. The team was runner up in the inaugurated Super 7 league created in 2013/14. In previous seasons the women's team won the London Cup competition in 2009 and 2011. In 2014/15 the women's team participated in the Women's EHF Challenge Cup Round 3 where a highly unusual result of identical scores was recorded on both playing dates

Current women squad 
Squad for the 2015–16 season 

Goalkeepers
 1  Anita Rylow
 16  Amalie Lovaas Flaethe
Wingers
 8  Maria Kourdoulos
 20  Ulrike Stange
 9  Paula Mazur
 46  Ola Marcinkowska
 14  Nadia Risnes
 17  Anna Hampshire

Line players
 3  Cristina Matei
 12  Caroline Brodahl
 10  Agata Garbowska
 19  Hanna Finell
Back players
 6  Olimpia Lopes DaVeiga
 11  Loredana Lupu
 13  Arantzazu Marin Pacheco
 15  Nikolett Szollos-Wendler

Transfer signings 
 2   Zsofia Nyakas 
 18  Malin Alders

Notable former players 

  Karonlina Hentze
  Fatimata Niang
  Kaia Tufteland
  Maddie Edwards
  Krisztina Toth
  Nikoletta Papp
  Marianna Meryova
  Agnes Foeglein
  Nikoletta Rau
  Lisa Johansen Persheim
  Charlotte Morkken
  Maria Garcia Pedrosa
   Micaela Casasola

References

External links 
 
 Women's team profile on EHF website

English handball clubs
Sport in the London Borough of Richmond upon Thames